The Sudanese National Theatre is a theatre company established in 1959. It is situated in Omdurman, Sudan.

References

Theatre companies
Omdurman
Society of Sudan